The Secretary of the District of Columbia is one of the officers of the Government of the District of Columbia.  The position of Secretary of the District is equivalent to the office of Secretary of State in other U.S. states.

The current Secretary of State of the District of Columbia is Kimberly A. Bassett.

The Secretary of State of the District of Columbia's Office is composed of six divisions:
 The Ceremonial Services Unit processes requests for various ceremonial items such as proclamations.
 The Office of Documents and Administrative Issuances prepares and publishes the official government documents of the District, including the District of Columbia Register and the District of Columbia Municipal Regulations
 The Office of Notary Commissions and Authentications commissions District of Columbia notaries public and authenticates documents for domestic and foreign use.
 The Office of Protocol and International Affairs is the District government’s primary liaison with the diplomatic and international community for both substantive and ceremonial matters.
 The Office of Public Records and Archives is the records management office of the District and is responsible for the archiving of government documents.
 The Office of the Secretary, which is the main office of the Secretary of the District.  The Office of the Secretary is the custodian of the Seal of the District of Columbia.

List of secretaries of the District of Columbia

References